Marc Scott (born 21 December 1993) is a British long-distance runner. He took his first global medal with bronze in the 3000 metres at the 2022 World Indoor Championships. He is the European indoor record holder for the 5000 metres.

Scott represented Great Britain in the 5000 metres at the 2017 London and the 2019 Doha World Athletics Championships and at the 2020 Tokyo Olympics.

Running career
Scott started running at the age of 11. He grew up playing football as well as running, and was "moderately" successful as a high school runner according to Tulsa World. Tulsa's cross country and distance coach Steve Gulley claimed that he did not seek international recruits, but that Scott reached out to him. In addition to this, an accomplished British runner put in a good word for Scott.

On 5 June 2017 Scott was admitted to hospital for a seizure he experienced four miles into a regular training run. He reportedly had experienced seizures in the past. In spite of the hospitalisation, doctors did not forbid him from racing, and he went on to win the men's 10,000 metres at the 2017 NCAA DI Outdoor Championships in a time of 29:01.54, running the last 400 metres in 55.44 seconds.

After graduating from Tulsa, Scott joined the Bowerman Track Club. He raced the men's 5000 metres at the 2018 European Championships, placing fifth in the final.

In 2019, he won the Great South Run road 10 miles.

Scott became a double British champion when winning the 5000 metres event at the 2020 British Athletics Championships in a time of 13 min 32.98 sec. He had previously took the title in 2018.

In 2021, he claimed victories at the Great North Run half marathon and the Great Manchester Run road 10K.

Scott's bronze medal in the 3000 metres at the 2022 World Indoor Championships in Belgrade was only the second time in the meet history that a British male has medalled over the distance.

Achievements
Information taken from World Athletics profile.

International competitions

National and NCAA titles
 British Athletics Championships
 5000 metres: 2018, 2020, 2022
 British Indoor Athletics Championships
 3000 metres: 2022
 NCAA Division I Outdoor Track and Field Championships
 10,000 metres: 2017

Personal bests
 1500 metres – 3:35.93 (Portland 2020)
 One mile indoors – 4:05.36 (Iowa City 2017)
 3000 metres – 7:36.08 (Phoenix 2021)
 3000 metres indoors – 7:46.11 (Seattle 2020)
 5000 metres – 13:05.13 (San Juan Capistrano 2021)
 5000 metres indoors – 12:57.08 (Boston 2022) European record
 10,000 metres – 27:10.41 (San Juan Capistrano 2021)
Road
 5 kilometres – 13:20 (Barrowford 2020)
 10 kilometres – 28:03 (Manchester 2021)
 10 miles – 46:58 (Portsmouth 2019)
 Half Marathon – 60:39 (Larne 2020)

References

External links

 

1993 births
Living people
Athletes from Yorkshire
People from Northallerton
English male long-distance runners
British male long-distance runners
English male cross country runners
British male cross country runners
World Athletics Championships athletes for Great Britain
British Athletics Championships winners
English expatriates in the United States
Olympic athletes of Great Britain
Athletes (track and field) at the 2020 Summer Olympics
Tulsa Golden Hurricane men's track and field athletes
World Athletics Indoor Championships medalists
20th-century British people
21st-century British people